Richard Julian DeBenedictis (born January 23, 1935) is an American composer noted for composing music for television shows including Perry Mason and its movies from 1985 until 1993, Police Story, Columbo, Father Dowling Mysteries, The Rockford Files, Hawaii Five-O, Phyllis, and Matlock, and its spin-offs Jake and the Fatman, and Diagnosis: Murder. 
He is also known for his production music, which has been used in shows, commercials, video games and films.

DeBenedictis has been nominated ten times for an Emmy Award, most recently in 1996, for his  compositions.

After retiring from television composing, DeBenedictis has taught several master class in Los Angeles and New York City, including California Institute of the Arts, Pepperdine University, Pierce College, Ithaca College, and California Lutheran University.

He is the father of Dean, Brian, Lara and Brent.

Discography
 SCD 709 Dramatic Workshop 26 - Moodsetters, Links & Stings (album released in 2006, tracks recorded in the early 1990s, contains most of his production music tracks)

Notes

External links
 

1935 births
Living people
American film score composers
American male film score composers
American television composers
Male television composers